Glenridge Hall was a historic property in Sandy Springs, Georgia, United States. The house was built in 1929 and listed on the National Register of Historic Places in 1982. The site was demolished and delisted in 2015.

History 
Glenridge Hall was built by Atlanta businessman and co-founder of Georgia Power Thomas K. Glenn in 1929. The house would serve as Glenn's residence until his death in 1946. Starting in the early 1980s, Glenn's granddaughter began to restore the house, and it was listed on the National Register of Historic Places in 1982. In the following years, the building was used for many charitable events and fundraisers, and it was used as a filming location for such films and series as Driving Miss Daisy and The Vampire Diaries.

In July of that year, the property was put up for sale. Later that year, the Georgia Trust for Historic Preservation placed the property on its 2015 list of Places in Peril. In 2015, it was announced that the house would be demolished to make way for Mercedes-Benz's U.S. headquarters and for residential developments by Roswell, Georgia-based homebuilding company Ashton Woods. Following this announcement, historic preservationists in the area voiced their objection to the house's destruction, and they created a petition on Change.org arguing against its destruction. By April 2015, the petition had over 15,000 signatures. Despite this, the mansion was demolished on April 9.

See also 
 National Register of Historic Places listings in Fulton County, Georgia

References

Further reading 
 

1929 establishments in Georgia (U.S. state)
Buildings and structures completed in 1929
Buildings and structures demolished in 2015
Demolished buildings and structures in Georgia (U.S. state)
Former National Register of Historic Places in Georgia
National Register of Historic Places in Fulton County, Georgia
Residential buildings on the National Register of Historic Places in Georgia (U.S. state)